Eli Eli Lama Sabachthani? refers to:
the opening words of Psalm 22 in Aramaic, translated as "My God, my God, why hast Thou forsaken me" in the King James Version
one of the Sayings of Jesus on the cross

It may also refer to:
Eli Eli Lama Sabachthani? (film), written and directed by Jiju Antony
My God, My God, Why Hast Thou Forsaken Me? (film), originally titled Eli, Eli, Lema Sabachthani? , Japanese film directed by Shinji Aoyama
"Eloi, Eloi, Lama Sabachthani", or "The Baumoff Explosive", a short story by William Hope Hodgson